Kanyaka, South Australia is a town and locality.

Kanyaka, South Australia may also refer to the following places in South Australia:

District Council of Kanyaka, a former local government area
Kanyaka Station, a pastoral property
Hundred of Kanyaka, a cadastral unit

See also
Kanyaka (disambiguation)
District Council of Kanyaka-Quorn